Invisible Lantern is the third studio album by alternative rock band Screaming Trees, released in 1988 on SST Records.

Critical reception
Trouser Press wrote that "the Trees’ pop streak matures with 'Smokerings' and especially the marvelous 'Night Comes Creeping'." The Spin Alternative Record Guide called the album the band's SST peak.

Track listing

Personnel
Screaming Trees
Mark Lanegan – lead vocals
Gary Lee Conner – guitar, backing vocals, organ
Van Conner – bass, backing vocals
Mark Pickerel – drums, percussion

Additional personnel
Steve Fisk – producer, piano on "Grey Diamond Desert"
Rod Doak – engineering
Daniel Herron – front cover artwork
Jenna Scott – photographs and lettering

In other media 
While recording Invisible Lantern, Mark Lanegan, Mark Pickerel, and Van Conner appeared in the independent film 'Fertilichrone Cheerleader Massacre' along with producer Steve Fisk, which was shot in Ellensburg by Shawn O'Neill. The film was most recently released in 2012.

References

Screaming Trees albums
1988 albums
SST Records albums
Albums produced by Steve Fisk